The 1983 German Formula Three Championship was a multi-event motor racing championship for single-seat open wheel formula racing cars held across Europe. The championship featured drivers competing in two-litre Formula Three racing cars which conformed to the technical regulations, or formula, for the championship. It commenced on 1 May at AVUS and ended at Zolder on 21 August after eight rounds.

Scuderia Teutonia driver Franz Konrad became a champion. He took wins Nürburgring and Kaufbeuren. His title rival Hans-Peter Pandur, who lost  just by two points won races at Erding and Diepholz Airfield Circuit. Volker Weidler won race at Wunstorf and completed the top-three in the drivers' standings. Harald Brutschin, Rudi Seher and Marc Duez were the only other drivers who were able to win a race in the season.

Teams and drivers

Calendar

Results

Championship standings
Points are awarded as follows:

References

External links
 

German Formula Three Championship seasons
Formula Three season